These are the official results of the Men's Long Jump event at the 1999 World Championships in Seville, Spain. There were a total number of 45 participating athletes, with the final held on Saturday 28 August 1999.

Medalists

Schedule
All times are Central European Time (UTC+1)

Abbreviations
All results shown are in metres

Qualification
 Held on Thursday 26 August 1999

Final

See also
 1999 Long Jump Year Ranking

References
 IAAF
 todor66
 trackandfieldnews

D
Long jump at the World Athletics Championships